Settle or SETTLE may refer to:


Places
 Settle, Kentucky, United States, an unincorporated community
 Settle, North Yorkshire, a town in England
 Settle Rural District, a historical administrative district

Music
 Settle (band), an indie rock band from Pennsylvania
 Settle (album), the 2013 debut album by Disclosure
 Settle: The Remixes, the 2013 remix companion album by Disclosure
 "Settle" (Vera Blue song), a 2016 song by Australian singer songwriter Vera Blue

People
 Settle (surname)

Other uses
 Settle (furniture), a wooden bench 
 SETTLE, a constraint algorithm used in computational chemistry

See also
 Settling, a chemical process 
 Settler, a person who migrates to a new area and resides there
 Settles (disambiguation)
 Settlement (disambiguation)